Henri François Berton called Berton fils (3 May 1784, in Paris – 19 July 1832, in Paris) was an early 19th-century French composer. 
 
Pierre Montan Berton was his grandfather and Henri-Montan Berton his father. He died of cholera.

Selected works 
 1810: Le Présent de noces, ou le Pari, one-act opéra comique, music by Henri François Berton, Théâtre Feydeau, 2 January
 1811: Ninette à la cour, opéra comique in 2 acts and in verse, after Charles-Simon Favart, music by Henri Montan Berton, Opéra-Comique, 24 December
 1834: Le Château d'Urtuby, one-act opéra comique, libretto by Gabriel de Lurieu and Raoul, created on a posthumous music 14 January at the Théâtre royal de l'Opéra-Comique.

References

External links 

 Henri Berton on 

French classical composers
French male classical composers
1784 births
Musicians from Paris
1832 deaths
19th-century French male musicians